Below is a timeline of the social networking service Instagram.

Timeline

See also
 Timeline of Pinterest
 Timeline of Snapchat
 Timeline of Twitter
 Timeline of Facebook
 Timeline of social media

References

Instagram
Instagram
Instagram